This War Will Last Forever is the debut album by Scottish metalcore band Mendeed.

Track listing

Standard version
"All That We Have Become (Intro)" - 3:38
"Beneath a Burning Sky" - 5:08
"Stand As One and Fight For Glory" - 4:55
"Remains of the Day" - 4:52
"Chapel Perilous" - 3:18
"The Mourning Aftermath" - 5:55
"Poisoned Hearts" - 3:21
"Withered and Torn" - 4:11
"Resurrecting Hope" - 4:08
"For Blasphemy We Bleed" - 6:19
"The Reaper Waits" - 3:58
"The Black Death" - 10:12

Nuclear Blast re-release
"All That We Have Become (Intro)" - 3:38
"Beneath a Burning Sky" - 5:08
"Stand As One and Fight For Glory" - 4:55
"Remains of the Day" - 4:52
"Chapel Perilous" - 3:18
"The Mourning Aftermath" - 5:55
"Poisoned Hearts" - 3:21
"Withered and Torn" - 4:11
"Resurrecting Hope" - 4:08
"For Blasphemy We Bleed" - 6:19
"The Reaper Waits" - 3:58
"The Black Death" - 4:42
The End of Man" (Bonus Track) - 3:35
Divided We Fall" (Bonus Track) - 10:03

Japanese release
"All That We Have Become (Intro)" - 3:38
"Beneath A Burning Sky" - 5:08
"Stand As One And Fight For Glory" - 4:55
"Remains of the Day" - 4:52
"Chapel Perilous" - 3:18
"The Mourning Aftermath" - 5:55
"Poisoned Hearts" - 3:21
"Withered And Torn" - 4:11
"Resurrecting Hope" - 4:08
"For Blasphemy We Bleed" - 6:19
"The Reaper Waits" - 3:58
"The Black Death" - 4:42
"Laid To Waste" - 4:13
"Perpetual Sin" - 5:25
"Messiah" - 4:12

References

2006 albums
Mendeed albums